The Reppie waste-to-energy plant is a waste-to-energy plant in Addis Ababa, Ethiopia, which treats waste from the city. The plant was developed by Cambridge Industries Ltd for Ethiopian Electric Power and Addis Ababa City Administration. The facility was founded by Samuel Alemayehu to tackle waste in the city of Addis Ababa. August 2018, the plant began operations, making it is the first waste-to-energy plant in Africa.

Overview 
The Reppie waste-to-energy plant includes two combustion systems (MARTIN SITY 2000 reverse grates) with 2 waste cranes with a capacity of 2x700 ton/d = 1400 ton/d. The Reppie site is built on reclaimed land from an old landfill.
The sites include facilities to process household and commercial waste, using waste combustion to recover energy, biological treatment, re-use, recycling and landfill.

References 

Power stations in Ethiopia
Addis Ababa